Oggi sposi may refer to:
 Just Married (1934 film), an Italian comedy film
 Oggi sposi (1952 film) 
 Oggi sposi (2009 film)